Duane L. Jones (April 11, 1937July 22, 1988) was an American actor and theatre director, best known for his lead role as Ben in the 1968 horror film Night of the Living Dead. He was later director of the Maguire Theater at the State University of New York at Old Westbury, and the artistic director of the Richard Allen Center for Culture and Art in Manhattan.

Early life and education
Jones was born in New York City to Mildred Jones (née Gordon). He had a sister, Marva (later Marva Brooks), and a brother, Henry. He graduated from the University of Pittsburgh with a B.A. and studied at the Sorbonne in Paris, before training as an actor in New York City. He later completed an M.A. in Communications at New York University in between shooting Night of the Living Dead.

Early career
Prior to becoming an actor, Jones was a Phelps-Stokes exchange scholar in Niger and taught literature at Long Island University. He created English-language training programs for the Peace Corps and helped design Harlem Preparatory School, where he headed the English department.

Career

His role in the 1968 film Night of the Living Dead marked the first time an African-American actor was cast as the star and hero of a horror film, and one of the first times in American cinema where an important role was given to a Black actor when the script did not explicitly call for one. While some saw the casting as significant, director George A. Romero stated Jones' race was not a factor in his casting; Romero cast him simply because "Jones was the best actor we met to play Ben."

Jones continued working in film after Night of the Living Dead in Ganja & Hess (1973), Losing Ground (1982), and Beat Street (1984), among others. Despite his other film roles, Jones worried that people only recognized him as Ben.

From 1972 to 1976, Jones oversaw the literature department at Antioch College. He was subsequently executive director of the Black Theater Alliance, a federation of theater companies, from 1976 through 1981 and continued working as a theater actor and director, until his death in 1988. As executive director of the Richard Allen Center for Culture and Art (RACCA), he promoted African-American theater. He also taught acting styles at the American Academy of Dramatic Arts in New York City.  After leaving the American Academy of Dramatic Arts, he taught a select group of students privately in Manhattan, by invitation only. His hand-selected students were of diverse ethnic backgrounds. The students were picked from his Acting Styles classes at American Academy of Dramatic Arts.

Death
Jones died of cardiopulmonary arrest at Winthrop-University Hospital in Mineola, Long Island, New York, on July 22, 1988, aged 51. He was cremated and his ashes given to his family.

Legacy
The Duane L. Jones Recital Hall at the State University of New York at Old Westbury is named after him.

In the zombie comic book series The Walking Dead, the character Duane Jones is named in his honour.

Filmography

References

External links

 
 

1937 births
1988 deaths
Male actors from New York City
American male film actors
Deaths from heart disease
University of Pittsburgh alumni
University of Paris alumni
Long Island University faculty
New York University alumni
Antioch College faculty
State University of New York at Old Westbury faculty
African-American male actors
African-American theater directors
American theatre directors
20th-century American male actors
20th-century African-American people